Fernando Londoño y Londoño (5 December 1910 – 3 November 1994) was a Colombian lawyer and diplomat who served as the third Permanent Representative of Colombia to the United Nations, the first Ambassador of Colombia to France, Ambassador of Colombia to Brazil, and Minister of Foreign Affairs of Colombia. A Conservative Party politician, he served in the Executive as Mayor of Manizales, Governor of Caldas, and Colombian Minister of Government, and in the Legislative as Member of the City Council of Manizales, the Departmental Assembly of Caldas, and the Chamber of Representatives of Colombia.

See also
 Fernando Londoño Hoyos

References

1910 births
1994 deaths
People from Manizales
Permanent Representatives of Colombia to the United Nations
Ambassadors of Colombia to France
Ambassadors of Colombia to Brazil
Foreign ministers of Colombia
Colombian Ministers of Government
Kidnapped Colombian people
Governors of Caldas Department
Colombian Conservative Party politicians
Members of the Chamber of Representatives of Colombia